Thomas Lindsay Galloway MA, FRSE. FGS, AMInst, MInstME (1854 – 22 September 1921) was the youngest son of William Galloway (1799–1854) shawl manufacturer and coal master of Paisley, Scotland and Margaret Lindsay (1818–1902). He was a civil and mining engineer and coal master of Argyll Colliery, Campbeltown, Kintyre, and like his brothers, Sir William Galloway and Robert Lindsay Galloway, he was also the author of several papers, lectures, designs and books.

Life

Thomas was born in Paisley, Renfrewshire. He was educated at Glasgow University where he studied under Lord Kelvin and was selected by him to travel to the sea off of Brazil to carry out the 'piano wire method' of deep sea soundings. The measuring equipment used by him is kept in the 'Kelvin Room' of the Royal Society of Edinburgh.

On his return from Brazil he concentrated on his studies of mining becoming a Mining Manager of East Scotland on 10 July 1876, a member of the North of England Institute of Mining Engineers 2 Sept 1876, aged 31, at the Argyll Colliery, Campbeltown, Kintyre.

He was also elected a Fellow of the Kintyre Archaeological Society in 1876, an interest he later shared with his wife, and a founder member and elected Vice Chairman at the inaugural meeting of the Kintyre Scientific Association on 24 October 1890.

While in Kintyre he became deeply involved, being the chief engineer for the Campbeltown and Machrihanish Light Railway which served his Argyll Colliery.

He died 22 September 1921 at Kilchrist, Campbeltown, Kintyre. His obituary was placed in the Proceedings of the Royal Society of Edinburgh, The Geological Society of 1922

Literary Career and Inventions 

In 1878 T. Lindsay Galloway wrote 'On the Present Condition of Mining in Some of the Principal Coal Producing Districts of the Continent'

The same year he presented a paper, together with C.Z. Bunning, entitled 'A Description of an Instrument for Levelling Underground' to the North of England Institute of Mining & Mechanical Engineers (NEIMME).

His mining surveys of 1881 are kept by the NEIMME

In 1902 he read a paper entitled 'The Campbeltown Colliery and Light Railway' to the Glasgow Association of Students of the Institution of Civil Engineers, and his notes are referred to by the 'Transactions of the Institute of Mining Engineers' Vol. 45

In 1903 he read before the Glasgow University Engineering Society papers describing various methods of supplying power to mines, and indicating why different methods have found suitable spheres of application. Then in 1905 he instructed the Institute of Mining Engineers that he had recently had erected an electric plant at Campbeltown colliery.

His Papers on 'Experiments with two electrically driven pumps' were discussed by the Institute of Mining Engineers, Kilmarnock 8 August 1908

In 1918 T. Lindsay Galloway read a paper to the Institute of Mining Engineers entitled 'A method of determining the magnetic meridian as a basis for mining surveys'. He had also invented a portable mining magnetometer, to assist in surveys. This is again described in Vol. 23 of 'The Mining Magazine' of 1920, the 'Engineering and Mining Journal' Vol. 106 of 1918, and 'Nature' Vol. 101 1918

In a paper of 1919 he drew attention to the advantage of using a theodolite and this was repeated in 'Transactions of the Institution of Mining Engineers' Vol. 60 of 1920

He wrote several papers which were referred to in 'The Mining Engineer' Vols. 60-61 of 1921

Family 

Thomas Lindsay Galloway married Margaret Maria Christina MacNab, daughter of Duncan MacNab and Margaret McCullock of Kintyre, and widow of Cyril Leslie Johnson, in Paddington, London 1902. She had a son by her previous marriage.

Bibliography 

 Galloway T. Lindsay. 'The Campbeltown Colliery and Light Railway' Aird & Coghill, Glasgow. 1902

Honours 
Fellow of the Royal Society of Edinburgh
Fellow of the Geological Society 1876

References

External links 
 

1854 births
1921 deaths
British mining engineers